Kirksville Regional Airport  is four miles south of Kirksville, on the west side of US highway 63. One airline schedules passenger flights, subsidized by the Essential Air Service program.

Federal Aviation Administration records say the airport had 684 passenger boardings (enplanements) in calendar year 2008, 926 in 2009 and 2,127 in 2010. The National Plan of Integrated Airport Systems for 2011–2015 categorized it as a general aviation facility (the commercial service category requires at least 2,500 enplanements per year).

Cape Air is the current airline, averaging 900 to 1,000 passengers per month on three daily round trips to St. Louis Lambert International Airport. After Cape Air notified the city in November 2022 of their plans to terminate their service, the Kirksville City Council approved a contract on February 6, 2023 with Contour Airlines, with service beginning in June to Chicago O'Hare International Airport.

History 

Local resident Nick Sparling is credited as being Adair County's first aviator, in 1909. In 1924, Roy B. "Cap" Dodson started the first airport in the area, located on the north edge of Kirksville. However, an airfield at the present location of Kirksville Regional Airport wasn't created until 1930 when the Federal Aviation Administration built a series of emergency landing strips across the nation. With America's entry into World War II, the Kirksville Municipal Airport, as it had been declared in the late 1930s, received a major upgrade from the Civilian Pilots Training Program and the US Army Air Corps War Training Service. In 1942 a paved all-weather landing strip, hangars, a control tower and small restaurant were built; the paved runway was 3870 ft until 1968.

In 1960, Ozark Air Lines began scheduled flights. The Ozark route began in Kansas City to Chicago with stops in Kirksville, Ottumwa, Cedar Rapids, Iowa and Moline, Illinois. Airport improvements came after a bond issue was approved by Kirksville voters in 1967. A new six-thousand foot concrete runway was built, as well as a new terminal building and improved hangar facilities. The longer runway was needed for the faster Fairchild prop-jet that began flights to Kirksville in late 1968. Also in the 1960s, Ozark switched Kirksville service from a Kansas City-Chicago route to a Des Moines-to-St. Louis one. With the airport improvements came a new name, Clarence Cannon Memorial Airport—chosen to honor long-time US Congressman Clarence Cannon of Missouri who had done much to help secure air service and funding for the airport.

Ozark Airlines found flew their final route on April 23, 1976. Fortunately a local pilot and dentist, Dr. Stephen Barber, has established a small commuter air service, Horizon Airways, in 1972. Horizon was able to help fill the void left by Ozarks departure, eventually expanding to five aircraft and service to both Kansas City and St. Louis.

Air Choice One began scheduled flight operations twice daily, to and from Lambert-St. Louis International Airport during July 2009. Scheduled operations are currently subsidized by the Essential Air Service Act. Previously service was operated by Air Midwest (operating as US Airways Express) to Kansas City International Airport and by RegionsAir (operating as American Connection) with flights to Lambert-St. Louis International Airport. In September, 2010 Cape Air replaced Air Choice One.

In November 2022, Cape Air notified Kirksville of their plans to terminate service.  However, the airline was still required to continue their flights until the city selected a replacement.  The Kirksville City Council approved a contract on February 6, 2023 with Contour Airlines, with 12 flights per week beginning in June to Chicago O'Hare International Airport.

Facilities
The airport covers 476 acres (193 ha) at an elevation of 966 feet (294 m). It has two runways: 18/36 is 6,005 by 100 feet (1,830 x 30 m) concrete; 9/27 is 1,370 by 100 feet (418 x 30 m) turf.

In the year ending June 30, 2010 the airport had 5,625 aircraft operations, average 15 per day: 62% general aviation, 21% airline, 13% air taxi, 4% military. 35 aircraft were then based at the airport: 83% single-engine, 11% multi-engine, and 6% helicopter.

Airline and destination

Scheduled passenger service:

Incidents 
 On October 19, 2004, Corporate Airlines Flight 5966 crashed on approach to Kirksville. Thirteen individuals died and two sustained injuries. The National Transportation Safety Board determined pilot error to be the cause of the accident.
 On May 12, 2005 a Midwest Airlines Boeing 717 made an emergency landing at Kirksville Regional Airport after encountering icing and subsequent pilot induced loss of control. To date it is the largest aircraft to have landed at Kirksville Airport.
 On November 5, 2013 American business executive Robert Groh, President of Geo-Syntheics, LLC, and an instructor pilot were killed when their plane crashed on final approach to Kirksville Regional Airport. The plane, a Piper PA-32 Saratoga, went down in a rural area of Adair County approximately 2.5 miles northeast of the runway shortly after a radio check-in with airport personnel. At that time the pilot reported no difficulties. The plane was on a cross-country flight from Centennial Airport near Denver, Colorado to Waukesha, Wisconsin, the home city for Geo-Syntheics.

References

Other sources 

 Essential Air Service documents (Docket DOT-OST-1997-2515) from the U.S. Department of Transportation:
 Order 2005-6-14: re-selecting RegionsAir, Inc. d/b/a American Connection, formerly known as Corporate Airlines (RegionsAir), to provide subsidized essential air service (EAS) at each of the above communities for a new two-year period from June 1, 2005, through May 31, 2007
 Order 2006-8-19: selecting Air Midwest, Inc., a wholly owned subsidiary of Mesa Air Group, Inc., d/b/a US Airways Express (Air Midwest), to provide essential air service (EAS) at Kirksville, Missouri, at an annual subsidy rate of $627,100. This rate and carrier selection will become effective for the two-year period beginning when Air Midwest replaces RegionsAir, Inc. (formerly Corporate Airlines, Inc.), d/b/a American Connection (RegionsAir) at Kirksville.
 Order 2008-5-2: selecting Multi-Aero, Inc. d/b/a Air Choice One to provide essential air service at Kirksville, Missouri with 11 nonstop stop round trips each week to St. Louis on 6 or 9-seat Twin Engine aircraft. Annual subsidy rate $806,169.

External links 
 Kirksville Regional Airport at City of Kirksville website
 Aerial image as of April 1995 from USGS The National Map
 
 

Airports in Missouri
Airports established in 1930
Buildings and structures in Adair County, Missouri
Essential Air Service
1930 establishments in Missouri